Usta Muhammad (Balochi: اوستہ محمد, Sindhi: اوسته محمد) is a city and sub-division of the Usta Muhammad District of Balochistan Province, Pakistan.

Geography 
The city has an area of 978 km2.

Demographics
According to the 2017 Census of Pakistan, the city population was approximately 76,753, while the tehsil population was estimated to be 186,226.

Ethnicity 

The majority of the people are Balochs, Brahvis, and Jamotes;

The Baloch tribes include Jamali, Babbar, Umrani, Rind, Bulledi, Jatoi, Marri, Hijwani, Bugti, Mastoi Chandia, and others

The Brahui tribes include Mengal, Bangulzai, Jattak, Lehri, Pandarani, Neechari, Zehri, and others

The Sindhi (Jamotes) include Qureshi, Soomro Siyal, Usto Palal, Abro, Seelra, Mangi, Solangi, Maken, Langah, Boohar, Kori, Bhangar, and Samejo Sheikh Tunio.

Religion 
Relative to their share of the overall Balochistan population (0.4 percent), the city of Usta Muhammad has a significant Hindu community, forming approximately 4.2 percent of the population as of the 2017 census.

Governance 

The city has one Municipal Corporation where the Chief Administrator sits, and an Office of the Assistant Commissioner who controls the city's executive works and Price Control.

Unions in the district are Ali-abad, Faiz-abad, Khanpur, Bari Shaakh, Mehrabpur, Piral-abad, Qabula, Samaji, Sobarani, Usta Muhammad I, Usta Muhammad II, and Usta Muhammad III.

Geography
Usta Mohammad is in the Kachhi plain basin, with an average altitude of about 55 meters.  Annual rainfall is about 90mm, of which 60mm falls in winter (November–May). Winters are cold, and summers are dry and hot.

Economy 
As of 2020;

People in the city area of Usta Muhammad are much more noble and have businesses in commercial places. Mostly wealthy people here own rice mills, and some have Estate Agency businesses. People in the city who are poor are mostly labourers.

In remote areas, some people are landlords while others have small businesses.

The people of the district are predominantly poor, with inadequate access to medical supplies and facilities.

Crops include rice, wheat, and sorghum. A 2002 survey determined that the incidence of Sporisorium sorghi, the causal organism of sorghum grain smut, reached 7% in Usta Mohammad. A survey of rice farmers found that 33% were illiterate, 55% farmed from 12 to 40 acres of land, and 58.3% were tenant farmers. Some farms raise cattle, sheep, and goats.
Usta Mohammad has Railwaystation railways boundary connected Usta to Larkana (sindh) Usta Mohammad is 2nd biggest Business city of Balochistan. Usta is 2nd most populated city in Balochistan province Tea is very famous cafe among sttlers.

Education 
The city has an Agri-Development Institute and a Government Degree College. Every student went to the other cities for their studies because there were nothing any Study system like ( library,Hostels and many other facilities.

Transport 
Usta Mohammad has not a railway station; its railway boundaries are connected to Garhi Khairo, Larkana (Sindh).

See Also
 Jaffarabad District
 Dera Allah Yar
 Garhi Khairo

References

Populated places in Jafarabad District